Judith Mary Keall (née Dixon, born 10 January 1942) is a former New Zealand politician. She was an MP from 1984 to 1990, and again from 1993 until her retirement in 2002, representing the Labour Party.

Biography

Dixon was born in Timaru on 10 May 1942.

She was first elected to Parliament in the 1984 election, winning the North Shore seat of Glenfield. She was re-elected in the 1987 election, but in the 1990 election, she was defeated by National's Peter Hilt. In 1993, Keall was awarded the New Zealand Suffrage Centennial Medal.

In the 1993 election, she returned to Parliament as MP for the lower North Island seat of Horowhenua. After reentering parliament she supported Mike Moore when he was successfully challenged for the leadership by deputy leader Helen Clark. She was appointed by Clark as Labour's spokesperson for consumer affairs and senior citizens. In the 1996 election, when the Horowhenua electorate was abolished, she was elected as MP for the new Otaki electorate. She was re-elected in the 1999 election, but at the 2002 election, she chose to retire from Parliament. She was one of only two electorate MPs who retired in 2002; the other was Labour's Geoff Braybrooke. Keall was succeeded by her former Parliamentary Secretary, Darren Hughes.

Keall chaired Parliament's health select committee and she was the key proponent of legislation that would make bars and restaurants smoke-free.

Keall was separated from her husband Graeme for seven years and part of her retirement from politics was that she could spend more time with him.

References

1942 births
Living people
People from the Auckland Region
Women members of the New Zealand House of Representatives
New Zealand Labour Party MPs
New Zealand MPs for Auckland electorates
New Zealand MPs for North Island electorates
Members of the New Zealand House of Representatives
Unsuccessful candidates in the 1990 New Zealand general election
21st-century New Zealand politicians
21st-century New Zealand women politicians
Recipients of the New Zealand Suffrage Centennial Medal 1993